Water polo events were contested at the 1983 Summer Universiade in Edmonton, Alberta, Canada.

References
 Universiade water polo medalists on HickokSports

1983 Summer Universiade
Universiade
1983
1983